Samogitian may refer to:
 Anything pertaining to Samogitia (Žemaitija), the Lowlands of Lithuania
 Samogitians, inhabitants of Samogitia
 Samogitian dialect, a dialect of the Lithuanian language, sometimes regarded as a separate language

Language and nationality disambiguation pages